The enzyme taxadiene synthase (EC 4.2.3.17) catalyzes the chemical reaction

geranylgeranyl diphosphate  taxa-4,11-diene + diphosphate

This enzyme belongs to the family of lyases, specifically those carbon-oxygen lyases acting on phosphates.  The systematic name of this enzyme class is geranylgeranyl-diphosphate diphosphate-lyase (cyclizing, taxa-4,11-diene-forming). Other names in common use include geranylgeranyl-diphosphate diphosphate-lyase (cyclizing, and taxadiene-forming).  This enzyme participates in diterpenoid biosynthesis.

References

 
 
 
 
 

EC 4.2.3
Enzymes of unknown structure